Ignatius Jerome Strecker (November 23, 1917 – October 16, 2003) was an American prelate of the Roman Catholic Church. He served as archbishop of the Archdiocese of Kansas City in Kansas from 1969 to 1993.  He previously served as bishop of the Diocese of Springfield-Cape Girardeau in Missouri from 1962 to 1969.

Biography

Early life 
Ignatius Strecker was born on November 23, 1917  in Spearville, Kansas, to William and Mary (Knoeber) Strecker. He was baptized at St. John the Baptist Church, where his parents were also the first couple to be married. He had a brother, Henry; and five sisters, Agnes, Catherine, Mary, Elizabeth, and Wilhelmina. 

Strecker attended Maur Hill High School and St. Benedict's College, both in Atchison, Kansas.  He then went to Kenrick Seminary in St. Louis.

Priesthood 
Strecker was ordained to the priesthood for the Diocese of Wichita by Bishop Christian Winkelmann on December 19, 1942, celebrating his first Mass in his native Spearville two days later. He then studied canon law at the Catholic University of America, and was later made chancellor of the Diocese of Wichita in 1948.

Bishop of Springfield-Cape Girardeau 
On April 7, 1962, Strecker was appointed the second Bishop of Springfield-Cape Girardeau, Missouri, by Pope John XXIII. He received his episcopal consecration on June 20, 1962, from Archbishop Edward Hunkeler, with Bishops Charles Helmsing and Marion Forst serving as co-consecrators, in the Cathedral of the Immaculate Conception.  From 1962 to 1965, Strecker attended the Second Vatican Council in Rome.

Archbishop of Kansas City 
Pope Paul VI named Strecker as the second archbishop of the Archdiocese of Kansas City, Kansas on September 4, 1969. At age 51, Strecker was the second youngest prelate of that rank in the United States. He was elected president of the National Catholic Rural Life Conference twice.

Widely known as an advocate for small family farms, as well as the poor in the inner city and Hispanics, Strecker urged Congress to work toward a comprehensive food and agricultural policy. He testified before the House Agriculture Committee in 1984, during hearings in preparation for comprehensive farm policy legislation, and stated, "The fate of our family farmers is not an abstract concern...what happens to them will determine whether or not a land-owning elite will increasingly control our food and the price of that food."In 1990, Strecker established background and reference checks for all persons working with children - including employees and volunteers, at the archdiocese as part of a policy to combat sexual abuse of minors.

In 1992, Strecker denounced the pro-choice views of then-State Representative Kathleen Sebelius.  He accused Sebelius, a Catholic,  of leading "the death-march of the unborn to the abortion clinics in the House of Representatives" and "attempting to make the 'death-marches' to the abortion clinics as legal as the death-marches to the gas chambers of the World War II Holocaust."

Retirement and legacy 
After reaching the mandatory retirement age of 75, Strecker resigned his post as Archbishop on June 28, 1993, following twenty-three years of service. During that time, he earned the nickname of "Gracious Ignatius".

After a series of strokes and a fall, Ignatius Strecker died in Kansas City, Kansas, on October 16, 2003, at age 85.

References

External links
Catholic-Hierarchy
Diocese of Dodge City
National Catholic Reporter

1917 births
2003 deaths
People from Ford County, Kansas
Roman Catholic Diocese of Wichita
20th-century Roman Catholic archbishops in the United States
Participants in the Second Vatican Council
Catholic University of America alumni
Roman Catholic bishops of Springfield–Cape Girardeau
Roman Catholic archbishops of Kansas City in Kansas